Hana FC is a Solomon Islands football club based in Honiara, Solomon Islands, which currently plays in the Telekom S-League. Their home ground is Lawson Tama Stadium.

Current squad 
As of August 2014

Football clubs in the Solomon Islands
Honiara